Marcus Epps may refer to:
Marcus Epps (soccer) (born 1995), American soccer midfielder
Marcus Epps (American football) (born 1996), American football safety